The Dutch Basketball League Most Improved Player is an award that is yearly given to the most improved player in the DBL, the highest professional basketball league in the Netherlands. The award is handed out after the regular season. The award is handed out by the FEB (Federatie Eredivisie Basketbal).

Winners

Awards won by nationality

Awards won by club

References
General

Specific

Most Improved Player
Most improved awards